The 1918 Camp Perry football team represented the sailors of the United States Navy's Puget Sound Naval Shipyard located in Bremerton, Washington, during the 1918 college football season. The team compiled a 2–4 record. The Puget Sound Naval Shipyard was the headquarters of the Thirteenth Naval District.

Schedule

References

Camp Perry
Camp Perry football